Phosphide carbides or carbide phosphides are compounds containing anions composed of carbide (C4−) and phosphide (P3−). They can be considered as mixed anion compounds. Related compounds include the phosphide silicides, germanide phosphides, arsenide carbides, nitride carbides and silicide carbides.

In light rare earth phosphide carbides, the ethenide ion [C=C]4− exists. In these P and C2 are disordered, and they randomly substitute for each other, even though charge differs. Bonds between carbon and phosphorus are weak, and so these kind of compounds do not contain a C-P bond, instead carbon or phosphorus stand by themselves. 

Phosphide carbides can be made by heating a metal, red phosphorus and graphite powder together in a carbon crucible under an inert gas atmosphere.

List

References

Phosphides
Carbides
Mixed anion compounds